J. Arthur Roy House is a historic house located at 1204 Johnston Street in Lafayette, Louisiana.

Built in 1901 by J. Arthur Roy and designed by Arthur Van Dyke, the house is a two-story frame in Queen Anne and Stick-Eastlake style, with a two-story front gallery and a single story side gallery featuring Eastlake columns.

The house was listed on the National Register of Historic Places on June 14, 1984.

See also
 National Register of Historic Places listings in Lafayette Parish, Louisiana

References

Houses on the National Register of Historic Places in Louisiana
Stick-Eastlake architecture in Louisiana
Queen Anne architecture in Louisiana
Houses completed in 1901
Lafayette Parish, Louisiana
National Register of Historic Places in Lafayette Parish, Louisiana